Bulbophyllum adolphii is a species of orchid in the genus Bulbophyllum. The epithet adolphi commemorates Adolf Kempter, who collected the type specimen.

References 

 The Bulbophyllum-Checklist
 The Internet Orchid Species Photo Encyclopedia

adolphii